Bloomfield Township, officially the Charter Township of Bloomfield, is a charter township of Oakland County in the U.S. state of Michigan. As of the 2010 census, the township population was 41,070.

Established in 1827, it is the oldest township of Oakland County. In 2014, Bloomfield Township was ranked the most expensive community in which to live in the state of Michigan with a median home price of $224,977.

Communities
The Township has no incorporated villages and multiple unincorporated communities:
Bloomfield Village is located between Quarton Road on the north, Maple Road on the south, Lahser Road on the west and Glenhurst and Westwood on the east. The non-governmental Bloomfield Village Association provides police and fire services to the community in concert with those provided by Bloomfield Township. It also provides other community-specific services.
Charing Cross is located at Kensington and Charing Crossing Roads ( Elevation: 807 ft./246 m.) and previously had a railroad station.
Circle had a post office from 1894 until 1902.
Oak Grove is located on the boundary with Auburn Hills on South Blvd  between Opdyke Road and I-75 ( Elevation: 883 ft./269  m.).

Geography

Bloomfield Township borders Pontiac and Auburn Hills to the north.  The cities of Bloomfield Hills and Birmingham are within the original survey township.  West Bloomfield Township is to the west, the city of Troy is to the east, and Southfield Township is to the south. Bloomfield Township shares a small border with the city of Keego Harbor in the northwest corner of the township.  The main branch of the Rouge River rises in the township in Oakland County.

Demographics
As of the census of 2000, there were 43,023 people, 16,804 households, and 12,703 families residing in the township. The racial makeup of the township was 87.70% White, 4.30% Black or African American, 0.08% Native American, 6.47% Asian, 0.05% Pacific Islander, 0.29% from other races, and 1.11% from two or more races. Hispanic or Latino of any race were 1.38% of the population.

There were 16,804 households, out of which 31.1% had children under the age of 18 living with them, 68.1% were married couples living together, 5.7% had a female householder with no husband present, and 24.4% were non-families. 21.6% of all households were made up of individuals, and 9.3% had someone living alone who was 65 years of age or older.  The average household size was 2.53 and the average family size was 2.97.

In the township the population was spread out, with 23.8% under the age of 18, 4.2% from 18 to 24, 21.7% from 25 to 44, 32.5% from 45 to 64, and 17.8% who were 65 years of age or older.  The median age was 45 years. For every 100 females, there were 94.1 males.  For every 100 females age 18 and over, there were 91.2 males.

The median income for a household in the township was $103,897, and the median income for a family was $123,381 (These figures had risen to $119,233 and $144,033 as of a 2007 estimate). Males had a median income of $98,985 versus $50,540 for females. The per capita income for the township was $62,716.  About 1.2% of families and 2.5% of the population were below the poverty line, including 3.0% of those under age 18 and 3.1% of those age 65 or over.

Culture

Oakland Hills Country Club in Bloomfield Township has been host to a number of major professional golf events, including six U.S. Opens and the 2004 Ryder Cup.

Bloomfield Township is also home to the Detroit Skating Club where a number of figure skaters have trained, including single skaters Tara Lipinski, Todd Eldredge, Alissa Czisny, Adam Rippon, Jeremy Abbott and ice dancers Nathalie Pechalat/Fabian Bourzat, Kaitlyn Weaver/Andrew Poje, Naomi Lang/Peter Tchernyshev, Elizabeth Punsalan/Jerod Swallow. Coaches based at the DSC include Yuka Sato, Jason Dungjen (single skating), Anjelika Krylova, Pasquale Camerlengo, Massimo Scali, Elizabeth Punsalan, Natalia Annenko-Deller (ice dancing).

Education

Primary and secondary schools

Public school districts
The township's primary public school district is Bloomfield Hills School District (BHS), but large portions of the southeast corner and western edges of the township are in Birmingham Public Schools (BPS) and a portion of the northeast corner is in Avondale School District. Another portion is in the Pontiac School District.

The sole BHS district comprehensive high school is Bloomfield Hills High School in Bloomfield Township, formed in 2013 by the mergers of Andover High School and Lahser High School.

Two portions of Bloomfield Township are in the Birmingham Public Schools district (BPS). Students in the southeastern portion of the township, wrapping around the city of Birmingham, are zoned to one of four elementary schools (Harlan, Pembroke, Pierce, or Quarton), Derby Middle School, and Seaholm High School. Students in a small portion Bloomfield Township northwest of the intersection of Fourteen Mile Rd. and Lahser Rd. are zoned to Bingham Farms Elementary, Berkshire Middle School, and Groves High School. Students on the western side of the township, along with portions of BPS that extend into West Bloomfield Township, are zoned to West Maple Elementary, Berkshire Middle School, and Groves High School.

A portion of northeast Bloomfield Township is within the Avondale School District. Students in that section are zoned to R. Grant Graham Elementary School in Auburn Hills, Avondale Middle School in Rochester Hills, and Avondale High School in Auburn Hills.

Private schools and international programs
The Lower School and Junior School campuses of the Detroit Country Day School are located in the township as are Academy of the Sacred Heart, Brother Rice High School, Marian High School, and the International Academy, a magnet school run by BHS. Other private schools including Cranbrook Schools, The Roeper School, and St. Hugo have campuses located just inside nearby Bloomfield Hills and Birmigham.

The French School of Detroit has its administrative offices at Meadow Lake Elementary School in the township. Preschool classes are held at Meadow Lake, while elementary school students attend classes at Meadow Lake and at any one of four partner elementary schools, including West Maple Elementary in Bloomfield Township.

Kensington Academy, a Catholic boy's elementary and middle school, first opened on the Sacred Heart campus in 1969. It moved into its own facility in 1982. In 2006 it announced that it was merging with Sacred Heart. At one time it occupied a facility in Bloomfield Township.

The Japanese School of Detroit, a weekend supplementary education program for Japanese nationals of primary and secondary school age, first started holding classes at Kensington Academy in 1981. It later had its school offices in the former Kensington Academy facility in Bloomfield Township.

Notable people 

 Aretha Franklin, soul singer; born in Tennessee, resided in Bloomfield Township
 Fred Blanding, pitcher with the Cleveland Naps; grew up in Bloomfield
 Ryan Kesler, National Hockey League player resides in Bloomfield in the offseason
 Bob Kula, football player
 Abby Quinn, actress, native of Bloomfield
 Elizabeth Reaser,  film, television, and stage actress (The Twilight Saga and Grey's Anatomy); born in Bloomfield
 Mitt Romney, former Governor of Massachusetts and presidential candidate, grew up in Bloomfield and attended Cranbrook Schools
 Chad Smith, musician, drummer (Red Hot Chili Peppers and Chickenfoot), Rock and Roll Hall of Fame member; graduate of Bloomfield Lahser High School, 1980
 Robin Williams, actor and comedian, grew up in Bloomfield
Andy Levin, former U.S. Congressman for the 9th district of Michigan, resides in Bloomfield Township

See also

 Bloomfield Hills Schools
 Detroit Country Day School
 Detroit Skating Club
 Kirk in the Hills
 Oakland Hills Country Club
 Woodward Corridor

References

Notes

Sources

External links
Bloomfield Township
Bloomfield Village

 
Charter townships in Michigan
Townships in Oakland County, Michigan
Metro Detroit
1827 establishments in Michigan Territory
Populated places established in 1827
Former census-designated places in Michigan